The CWA Heavyweight Championship is the primary professional wrestling singles title in the Century Wrestling Alliance. The title was first won by Tommy Dreamer who defeated "Mr. USA" Tony Atlas in a tournament final held in Wallingford, Connecticut on November 5, 1992, and defended throughout New England by former World Championship Wrestling and World Wrestling Federation wrestlers as well as some of the top independent wrestlers in the Northeastern United States. The title was combined with the CWA New England title to create the NWA New England Heavyweight Championship when the CWA joined the National Wrestling Alliance and became NWA New England in January 1998. The title returned to its original name when the CWA withdrew from the NWA on March 10, 2007.

Title history
Silver areas in the history indicate periods of unknown lineage.

References

National Wrestling Alliance championships
Heavyweight wrestling championships
Regional professional wrestling championships